Noah Howard (April 6, 1943 – September 3, 2010) was an American free jazz alto saxophonist.

Biography
Born in New Orleans, Howard played music from childhood in his church. He first learned trumpet and later switched to alto, tenor and soprano saxophone. He was an innovator influenced by John Coltrane and Albert Ayler. He studied with Dewey Johnson, first in Los Angeles and later on in San Francisco. When he moved to New York City he started playing with Sun Ra.

He recorded his first LP as a leader, Noah Howard Quartet, in 1966, and his second LP At Judson Hall later that year, both for ESP Records, but found little critical acclaim in the US. In the 1960s and 1970s he performed regularly in the US and Europe, moving to Paris in 1968.

In 1969, he appeared on Frank Wright's album One for John and on Black Gipsy with Archie Shepp. As leader he recorded The Black Ark  with Arthur Doyle among others. In 1971 he created his own record label, AltSax, and published most of his music under that label.

In 1971, he recorded Patterns in the Netherlands with Misha Mengelberg and Han Bennink. He moved to Paris in 1972, lived in Nairobi in 1982 and finally moved to Brussels in late 1982, where he had a studio and ran a jazz club. He recorded steadily through the 1970s and 1980s, exploring funk and world music in the latter decade and recording for AltSax. In the 1990s, he returned to his free-jazz origins, releasing on Cadence Jazz among other labels, and experienced a resurgence in critical acclaim. His last two albums, Desert Harmony (2008, with Omar al Faqir) and Voyage (2010), reflected his interest in World music and were influenced by Indian, Latin American and Middle Eastern music.

Noah Howard died on 3 September 2010 of a cerebral haemorrhage at the age of 67. He is survived by his wife, Lieve Fransen.

Discography

As leader or co-leader
Noah Howard Quartet (ESP-Disk, 1966)
At Judson Hall (ESP-Disk, 1968)
Space Dimension (America, 1970)
The Black Ark (Freedom, 1972)
Live at the Village Vanguard (Freedom / Intercord, 1972)
Patterns (Altsax, 1973) (reissued as part of Patterns/Message to South Africa)
Live at the Swing Club (Ricordi, 1974)
Live in Europe, Volume 1 (Sun Records, 1975) (reissued as Ole)
Red Star (Mercury, 1977) featuring Kenny Clarke
Berlin Concert (FMP, 1977)
Schizophrenic Blues (FMP, 1978)
Traffic (Frame, 1983)
Migration (Altsax, 1990)
Live at Documenta IX (Megadisc, 1992)
In Concert (Cadence, 1998)
Patterns/Message to South Africa (Eremite, 1999)
Between Two Eternities (Cadence, 2000) with Bobby Kapp
Live at the Unity Temple (Ayler, 2000)
Live in Paris (Altsax, 2001)
Dreamtime... (Altsax, 2003)
The Eye of the Improviser (Altsax, 2003) (compilation)
Desert Harmony (Altsax, 2007) with Omar Faqir
Transit Mission (Altsax, 2009) with Bobby Kapp
Voyage (Altsax, 2010)
Live at Glenn Miller Café (JaZt Tapes, 2012)
From Dust We Came... To Dust We Return (Dirter/Static Caravan, 2016) with Justin Wiggan and Chris Mapp

As sideman

With Chris Chalfant
Convergence (Chris Chalfant Music, 2007)

With Ted Daniel
Tapestry (Sun, 1977)

With James Emanuel
Middle Passage (Altsax, 2001)

With Zusaan Kali Fasteau
Expatriate Kin (CIMP, 1997)
Camaraderie (Flying Note, 1998)

With Eve Packer
West Frm 42nd (Altsax, 1998)
That Look (Boxholder, 2000)
NY Woman (Altsax, 2001) (single)
Window 9/11 (Altsax, 2002)
Cruisin w/Moxie (Altsax, 2003)
Now Playing (Altsax, 2009)
First and Last (EPHereNowMusic, 2010) (single)

With Archie Shepp
Black Gipsy (America, 1970)
Pitchin Can (America, 1970)

With Frank Wright
Uhuru na Umoja (America, 1970)
One for John (BYG, 1970)
Church Number Nine (Odeon, 1971)

Books
music in my soul (buddy's knife jazzedition, 2011)

References

External links
Noah Howard's official website

1943 births
2010 deaths
American jazz saxophonists
American male saxophonists
Free jazz saxophonists
Jazz musicians from New Orleans
Freedom Records artists
ESP-Disk artists
American male jazz musicians
FMP/Free Music Production artists
20th-century American saxophonists